Basilica di Santa Maria del Colle (Italian for Basilica of Santa Maria del Colle)  is a  Renaissance basilica in Pescocostanzo, Province of L'Aquila (Abruzzo).

History 
The first temple dates back to the 11th century. In 1456 the church was destroyed by an earthquake but was rebuilt as early as 1466, in the new and larger town, becoming a parish church and linking the entire village to the diocese of Cassino .

Architecture

References

External links

Maria del Colle
Maria del Colle
Pescocostanzo